The 1968 United States Senate election in Missouri took place on November 5, 1968.

Incumbent Democratic Senator Edward V. Long was defeated in the Democratic primary by Lieutenant Governor Thomas Eagleton. Eagleton narrowly defeated Republican U.S. Representative Thomas B. Curtis in the general election.

Primary elections
Primary elections were held on August 6, 1968.

Democratic primary

Candidates
W. True Davis Jr., former Assistant Secretary of the Treasury
Thomas Eagleton, Lieutenant Governor
Beverly Kitching
Edward V. Long, incumbent U.S. Senator
Lee C. Sutton, former member of the Missouri House of Representatives
William McKinley Thomas, perennial candidate

Results

Republican primary

Candidates
Thomas B. Curtis, U.S. Representative
Morris D. Duncan, unsuccessful candidate for Republican nomination for Senate in 1962 and 1964
Forest Nave Jr., Republican nominee for Missouri's 4th congressional district in 1966

Results

General election

Results

See also 
 1968 United States Senate elections

References

Bibliography
 
 

1968
Missouri
United States Senate